Cupid (Carrie Cutter) is a supervillain appearing in American comic books published by DC Comics. She is an enemy of Black Canary and Green Arrow, the latter of whom she is an unhealthy limerence with.

Cupid appeared as a recurring character on the Arrowverse television series Arrow, played by actress Amy Gumenick.

Publication history
Created by writer Andrew Kreisberg and artist David Baron, the character made her first appearance in Green Arrow and Black Canary #15 (February 2009).

Fictional character biography
Carrie Cutter was a special ops soldier, working for a top secret program called COBALT, who thought her husband Ross had abandoned her. During a mission in Georgia she encountered something that deeply disturbed her. She volunteered for a program that would make her fearless. It also turns her emotions up to the extreme when it comes to falling in love. Other effects included memory loss and increased strength. She fell off the radar for a long time. Years later, she found out that her husband Ross was still alive, tracked him to Star City and killed him. Green Arrow thought that the unknown man was abusing his wife so he shot an arrow at him. Cupid picked up that arrow which began her obsession with Green Arrow.

Cupid first showed up in Star City at a scene of one of Green Arrow's fights. She picked up a broken tip of one of his arrows and carved the infamous heart with an arrow through it on her chest. She began killing off some of his notable enemies in the hope that she may begin to fulfill his heart's desire. She is mentally unstable as upon getting a new haircut, she cut out the eyes of the hairdresser, for the hair was cut so perfectly that she did not want anyone else to ever have the same perfect hair. 
 
Small time enemies killed by Cupid include Big Game, Death Dealer, Vengeance, and Slingshot, which brought her to the attention of Star City's crime boss, Brick. When he learned of these killings, he sent his men to find out who was behind them. Within minutes of sending a street junkie out to find Cupid, she shot the junkie in the head and proceeded to fire upon Brick himself. As this did not work, she had a back-up plan in the form of a wrecking ball suspended from a crane. The crane cut through the building Brick was in and left him dead, cut in half at the waist. She had captured Merlyn from the police department, drugged him and lured Green Arrow to Star City Museum. Cupid had it arranged that Green Arrow, with a new-found darkness within him, would kill Merlyn and help himself achieve his hearts desire. Green Arrow did not follow through with Merlyn's death after seeing a way out of it and instead incapacitated him. This angered Cupid, who triggered an explosion. We next see her waking Green Arrow up underground.
 
She had chained him to the subway tracks and planned on dying with him in her arms so that it may be a romantically famous death, but Black Canary rescued him. Before admitting defeat, Cupid slit an unconscious Merlyn's throat. Knowing that Green Arrow and Black Canary would not let him die (despite him being one of their worst and most destructive enemies) she used that chance to escape. She has started to aid the city during a riot, using a bow, that she admits she needs practice with. This is mainly to impress Green Arrow, but has not succeeded.
 
After spending some time in prison, she is broken out by her rival Black Canary because her life was believed to be in danger. Later she encounters Everyman who believes himself to be Green Arrow and they begin to work together against the real Green Arrow and company. She is seen to still be obsessed with Oliver and only considers Everyman to be "good in a pinch". Cupid later killed Everyman herself, declaring their relationship as "a rebound thing".

Powers and abilities
Cupid is an exceptional hand-to-hand combatant. She possesses enhanced strength, speed, endurance, sense, etc.; but at the cost of her own sanity.

In other media

 Cupid appears in the "Green Arrow" segments of DC Nation Shorts, voiced by Kari Wahlgren.
 Carrie Cutter appears in the TV series Arrow, portrayed by Amy Gumenick. First appearing in season three, this version is a former member of the Star City Police Department's S.W.A.T. team who was forced to leave because of an attachment disorder. Amidst Slade Wilson's attack on Starling City, Cutter was saved by Oliver Queen / Arrow, leading to her developing an obsession with him and seeing herself as his partner in life. Taking the name "Cupid", she stalks Queen and uses his skill set to kill criminals in an attempt to show him how "right" they are for each other. Ultimately, she is apprehended by Queen, who recognizes her mental illness and sends her to Amanda Waller of A.R.G.U.S. rather than prison. Following this, Cutter becomes a member of Waller's Suicide Squad and maintains her obsession with Queen until she is saved by teammate Floyd Lawton and makes him the target of her obsession instead, though she is left devastated by Lawton's death during one of the squad's missions. As of season four, Cutter has finished her sentence and returns to Star City. However, she is left traumatized by Queen's rejection and Lawton's death and begins killing celebrity newlyweds to publicly demonstrate her belief that love is pointless. Queen and Felicity Smoak stage a wedding to draw out Cutter, who is subsequently arrested by Team Arrow. In season five, Cutter escapes from prison alongside China White and Liza Warner in the hopes of taking over Star City, only to be captured by Queen. In season seven, Cutter is recruited into the Suicide Squad's successor group, the "Ghost Initiative". Having learned Queen's identity as the Arrow, she develops a grudge against Smoak, who had become married to him.
 The Arrow incarnation of Carrie Cutter appears in The Flash: Season Zero. As part of a squad mission, she, Lawton, and Digger Harkness observe the Flash's fight with King Shark and attempt to recruit the latter.

References

External links
 Cupid comicbookdb

Fictional United States Army Special Forces personnel
Green Arrow characters
Black Canary characters
Comics characters introduced in 2009
DC Comics characters with superhuman strength
DC Comics martial artists
DC Comics military personnel
DC Comics female supervillains
Fictional assassins in comics
Fictional characters with neurological or psychological disorders
Fictional female military personnel
Fictional stalkers
Suicide Squad members
DC Comics metahumans